The Belezma Range, also transliterated as Belzma, is a prolongation of the Aurès Mountains, at the confluence of the Tell Atlas and the Saharan Atlas in northeastern Algeria. It is separated from the main Aurès Range by the Batna-El Kantara basin.

Geography and vegetation
The ridge is roughly aligned in an E-W direction. It is located at the western end of the Aurès Range, with the Hodna Mountains to the west.

The Belezma Range has one of the most important natural Atlas Cedar forests of Algeria.

The Belezma mountains have been traditionally inhabited by the Houaras Chaoui people. There is very low population density in the area and villages are few.

Belezma Plain
The Belezma Plain is an elevated intermontane basin located to the Northwest between the area of the National Park and Mount Mestaoua. The plain is one of the most fertile areas in the region and has traditionally been a granary for the local population. Mount Mestaoua, a veritable natural fortress, is a historical oppidum.

History  
The Ksar of Belezma to the north of the range is the site of an ancient Byzantine fortress. The now ruined structure was once used as an observation outpost by the Muslim and Arab dynasties that followed the Byzantine domination.

This massif was the last refuge of Abu Yazid before his death.

Protected areas

The Belezma National Park is a protected area on the slopes of the range. It is one of the most important national parks of Algeria.

Features

See also 
Geography of Algeria
Aures region

References

External links

Mountain ranges of the Atlas Mountains
Mountain ranges of Algeria
Geography of Batna Province